The counts of Holland ruled over the County of Holland in the Low Countries between the 10th and the 16th century.

House of Holland
The first count of Holland, Dirk I, was the son or foster-son of Gerolf, Count in Frisia (Dijkstra suggests that Dirk may have been the son of a sister of Gerolf and that his own father died while he was still an infant). He received land around Egmond from Charles the Fat at a place called Bladella (modern day Bladel near Eindhoven, The Netherlands) in 922. This is seen as the beginning of the county of Holland. However, until about 1100, the usual names for the county were West-Friesland, Frisia or Kennemerland; in spite of this the counts from Dirk I onwards are traditionally named of Holland.

Note that the chronology of the first few counts is uncertain. The existence of a count between Dirk I and Dirk II was only recently suggested, since it is thought that the references to counts named Dirk between 896 and 988 refer to three, not two, different counts. This third Count Dirk is placed between Dirk I and II and numbered as Dirk I bis to avoid confusion with the already established numbering referring to the other counts of Holland named Dirk.

Counts of Holland and West-Frisia (885–1433)
While the Frisian kingdom had comprised most of the present day Netherlands, the later province of Friesland in the Netherlands was much reduced. Already in the early Middle Ages West-Frisia (Frisia west of the Vlie) was not considered to be a part of Frisia anymore, and came to be known as Holland (present day provinces North and South Holland and Zeeland). Floris II was the first count who restyled his name from count of "West-Frisia", in count of "Holland".

Frisia Proper in medieval time therefore only included the middle and eastern part. The middle part (corresponding to the present day Dutch province of Friesland) was populated by free peasants who successfully resisted all attempts by feudal lords to subdue them, mainly the counts of Holland and the bishops of Utrecht. In the eastern part, local chieftains created their own states (within the Holy Roman Empire) in the late Middle Ages. They became a county after 1446 until 1744, after which it was incorporated within Prussia and later Germany.

The counts of West-Frisia ruled locally in the name of the archbishop of Utrecht, but over time, the counts of Holland came to dominate the bishopric of Utrecht. The archbishop of Utrecht governed the area on behalf of the Holy Roman Emperor, who saw is power diminished by the feudal system in which the counts and dukes ruled almost as sovereigns.

The counts of Holland tried frequently to increase their territory but apart from the acquisition of Zeeland during the 14th century they had no lasting success. Instead it became a part of the mighty medieval dynasties possessions, first Wittelsbach then Valois and thereafter Habsburg.

There was a war of succession between uncle (John III, Duke of Bavaria) and niece (Jacqueline, Countess of Hainaut). This war was finally won by Philip the Good in 1433, who, in the meantime had inherited John's claims on the county. Philip and Jacqueline were double first cousins, Philip's mother is daughter of Albert while Jacqueline's mother was daughter of Philip the Bold of Burgundy. In April 1433 he forced Jacqueline to abdicate from Hainaut and Holland on his behalf.

House of Valois-Burgundy

House of Habsburg
Maximilian (r. 1482-1494, regent), Holy Roman Emperor, husband of Mary I
Philip II the Handsome (r. 1494-1506), King Philip I of Castile
Charles II (r. 1515-1555), Holy Roman Emperor Charles V, King of Spain
Philip III (r. 1555-1581, 1581-1598 titular only), King Philip II of Spain

During the 'foreign rule' by Burgundy and Habsburg, the county was governed by a stadtholder in name of the count. In 1581, the Estates General of the United Provinces declared themselves independent from the Spanish rule of Philip II (who was Philip III of Holland). Until the Treaty of Münster in 1648, the kings of Spain still used the title Count of Holland, but they had lost the actual power over the county to the States of Holland.

Philip IV (1598 - 1621, titular only), King Philip III of Spain
Philip V (1621 - 1648, titular only, renounced 1648), King Philip IV of Spain

Aftermath 

The county remained in existence as a constituent member state of the Dutch Republic until 1795. There were no more counts however since the Estates of Holland and West-Frisia were the sovereign of the county (although the countship was offered to William the Silent in 1584, shortly before his death). The  stadtholders, who were servants of the Estates, were the de facto chief-executives during this period.

See also
A book of 32 plates of the counts of Holland published in Amsterdam in 1663, engraved by Adriaen Matham

References
B. K. S. Dijkstra, Een stamboom in been, Amsterdam 1991.
Counts of Holland

 
 
Countships of the Netherlands
Royal houses of the Netherlands
 
Lists of Dutch nobility
Lists of nobility of the Holy Roman Empire